GO 20 is a Floating dry dock of the Marina Militare.

History 
On 1992 based to Brindisi Naval Station

References

External links
 Ships Marina Militare website

Ships built in Italy
Auxiliary ships of the Italian Navy
1935 ships
Floating drydocks